Day of Remembrance may refer to the following:

International Holocaust Remembrance Day (27 January), an international memorial day that commemorates the victims of the Holocaust
Day of Remembrance (31 January), a commemorative day observed by NASA commemorating the loss of those in the Columbia, Challenger, and Apollo 1 incidents
Day of Remembrance (Japanese Americans) (19 February), day commemorating the Japanese American internment during World War II
Day of Remembrance for Truth and Justice (24 March), a commemorative day observed by Argentina
Remembrance of the Dead (4 May), a commemorative day observed in the Netherlands commemorating the war victims of conflicts since World War II
National Day of Remembrance (Cambodia) (20 May), a commemorative day observed in Cambodia
National Day of Remembrance of the victims of the Genocide of the Citizens of the Polish Republic committed by Ukrainian Nationalists (11 July)
Day of Remembrance (Turkmenistan) (6 October), day commemorating the 1948 Ashgabat earthquake
Day of Remembrance of the Victims of Political Repressions (30 October), a commemorative day observed by former Soviet countries
Remembrance Day (11 November), a commemorative day observed by many Commonwealth countries
Remembrance Sunday (2nd Sunday of November), this is held in the United Kingdom as a day to commemorate the contribution of British and Commonwealth military and civilian servicemen and women in the two World Wars and later conflicts
Transgender Day of Remembrance (20 November), a commemorative day observed by the LGBT community
Yom Hazikaron (4 Iyar), a commemorative day observed by Israel

See also
Days of Remembrance
Remembrance (disambiguation)